Edeco also Edeko, Edekon, Edicon, Ediko, Edica, Ethico (died 469) was a prominent Hun ambassador and the father of Odoacer.

Biography
According to sources of the time, he distinguished himself for courage and skill in the battles of Naissus and the Uthus river, during the invasion of the Eastern Roman Empire, thus becoming part of Attila's circle of favorite advisors, so much so that he put him in charge of a diplomatic mission in Constantinople, where the court treasurer, Chrysaphius, tried to bribe him to assassinate his king. Edeco seemed to agree, but as soon as he reached Attila's court he informed him of the plan and the Hun monarch unmasked the Roman ambassador. He played a part in the plot to kill Attila's brother, Bleda.

Edeco also participated in the campaign in Gaul and in the Battle of the Catalaunian Fields. He also fought at the Battle of Bolia, in which he apparently perished.

In 476, Edeco's son, Odoacer, deposed the emperor Romulus Augustulus and proclaimed himself king of Italy.

According to a legend, he was the progenitor of the old Welf dynasty. Some historians believe that Edeco, Odoacer's father, and Edeco, the Hun ambassador, were not the same person.

References

Huns
5th-century people
Attila the Hun
Ambassadors to the Byzantine Empire
469 deaths
People killed in action